No half measures may refer to:

No Half Measures Kerrang! Awards 2010 
No Half Measures Ltd., a music management company based in Glasgow 
No Half Measures, autobiography by Graeme Souness 1985
"No Half Measures", song by Niamh Parsons, composed by Alistair Hulett from album The Old Simplicity 2006
"No Half Measures", song by Your Demise